Noyu-dong is a dong, neighbourhood of Gwangjin-gu in Seoul, South Korea. It is a legal dong (법정동 ) administered under its two administrative dong (행정동 ), Jayang 3-dong and Jayang 4-dong.

See also 
Administrative divisions of South Korea

References

External links
 Gwangjin-gu official website in English
 Map of Gwangjin-gu at the Gwangjin-gu official website
 Jayang 3-dong resident office website
 Jayang 4-dong resident office website

Neighbourhoods of Gwangjin District